Tussocky Branch is a  long 1st order tributary to Gravelly Branch in Sussex County, Delaware.

Course
Tussocky Branch rises on the Gully Camp Ditch divide about 1 mile east of Gully Camp, Delaware, and then flows south to join Gravelly Branch about 0.25 miles east of Coverdale Crossroads.

Watershed
Tussocky Branch drains  of area, receives about 45.0 in/year of precipitation, has a wetness index of 718.06, and is about 16% forested.

See also
List of rivers of Delaware

References

Rivers of Delaware
Rivers of Sussex County, Delaware